Golden is an unincorporated community in Milo Township, Delaware County, Iowa, United States. The community lies at the junction of Iowa Highway 13 and County Road D42, three miles north of Ryan and 6.5 miles southwest of Manchester.

History
 
Golden was founded as a rail stop on the Illinois Central Railroad.

The community was founded in Section 31 of Milo Township. Originally called Golden Prairie, a post office opened on March 7, 1870, changed to the name Golden in 1883, and closed on June 30, 1902.

In 1887, the community's population was 60.

By 1914, the community consisted of just a few houses and a general store.

The Golden Congregational Church, southeast of Golden, was founded in October 1927; in 1936, it had 125 members. This church still operates, and observed its 150th anniversary in August 2019.

References

Unincorporated communities in Delaware County, Iowa
Unincorporated communities in Iowa